The Secretary of State for Territorial Administrations, currently named Secretary of State for Territorial Policy is the highest official of the Ministry of Territorial Policy responsible for the development of the Government's policy about Spain's territorial organization as well as responsible for the relations between the central government and the regional and local authorities.

It's also responsible for the supervision of the decentralized departments of the central government in the regions and impulse and coordination of the Conference of Presidents (the main forum of collaboration between the Prime Minister and the regional leaders), as well as the Presidency of the Council of Official Languages in the General Administration of the State.

Directly from the Secretary of State depends the Secretary General for Territorial Coordination.

History
The need to create a department focused on the coordination of the different state administrations appeared after the approval of the Constitution, which established a decentralized state composed of different autonomous communities. Given this, the Ministry of Territorial Administration was created in 1979 and was in force until the end of 1986.

In 1987, the Ministry of Public Administrations was created, which assumed the powers over the civil servants and the territorial organization, creating a Secretariat of State focused on the relations of the different administrations called the Secretary of State for Territorial Administrations.

In 2000, the Secretariat of State changed its name to Secretariat of State for the Territorial Organization of the State and changed its name again in 2004 to Secretariat of State of Territorial Cooperation until 2011 when PM Rajoy in an effort to reduce the deficit of the State, reduced the governmental apparatus integrating this Secretariat of State in the Secretariat of State for Public Administrations (in charge of the civil servants and now also of the relations between administrations) and the Ministry of Public Administrations also merged with the Ministry of the Treasury.

In 2016, with the economical improvement, the Secretariats of State of Public Function and Territorial Administration were separated again and the latest was integrated with its Ministry in the Ministry of the Presidency.

Since 2018, the Ministry for Territorial Administrations recovered its independence and was renamed Ministry for Territorial Policy and Public Function (taking the competencies over the civil servants from the Ministry of the Treasury). Briefly, from 2020 to 2021 the Secretariat of State assumed all the competences about civil service.

Structure
Under the Secretary of State are the following officials:
 The Secretary General for Territorial Coordination
 The Director-General for Regional and Local Cooperation
 The Deputy Director-General for Regional Cooperation
 The Deputy Director-General for Bilateral Relations with the Autonomous Communities
 The Deputy Director-General for Local Cooperation
 The Director-General for Regional and Local Legal Regime
 The Deputy Director-General for the Autonomous Legal System
 The Deputy Director-General for the Local Legal System
 The National Coordinator of the Internal Market Information System
The Director-General for the General State Administration in the Territory
The Deputy Director-General for Institutional Relations of the General State Administration in the Territory
The Deputy Director-General for the Coordination of the General State Administration in the Territory
The Deputy Director-General for Human Resources of the General State Administration in the Territory
The Deputy Director-General for Financial and Properties Management of the General State Administration in the Territory
The Inspectorate of Services of the General State Administration in the Territory

List of Secretaries of State for Territorial Administrations

References

Secretaries of State of Spain